is a 1989 Japanese comedy film directed by Yoji Yamada. It stars Kiyoshi Atsumi as Torajirō Kuruma (Tora-san), and Kumiko Goto as his love interest or "Madonna". Tora-san, My Uncle is the 42nd entry in the popular, long-running Otoko wa Tsurai yo series.

Cast
 Kiyoshi Atsumi as Torajirō
 Chieko Baisho as Sakura
 Fumi Dan as Hisako
 Shimojo Masami as Kuruma Tatsuzō
 Chieko Misaki as Tsune Kuruma (Torajiro's aunt)
 Hisao Dazai as Boss (Umetarō Katsura)
 Gajirō Satō as Genkō
 Hidetaka Yoshioka as Mitsuo Suwa
 Kumiko Goto as Izumi Oikawa (Mitsuo's girlfriend)
 Gin Maeda as Hiroshi Suwa
 Chishū Ryū as Gozen-sama

Critical appraisal
Hidetaka Yoshioka was nominated for Best Supporting Actor at the Japan Academy Prize for his role in Tora-san, My Uncle. He won this title at the Nikkan Sports Film Award ceremony. Kumiko Goto was nominated for Best Actress at the Japan Academy Prize. Kevin Thomas of the Los Angeles Times wrote that "This Tora-san, like all the others, in its depiction of warm family life and natural beauty, exudes a strong nostalgic pull for a Japan that was more spacious, beautiful and personal than it is today." The German-language site molodezhnaja gives Tora-san, My Uncle three and a half out of five stars.

Availability
Tora-san, My Uncle was released theatrically on December 27, 1989. In Japan, the film was released on videotape in 1996, and in DVD format in 1998, 2005, and 2008.

References

Bibliography

English

German

Japanese

External links
 Tora-san, My Uncle at www.tora-san.jp (official site)

1989 films
1989 comedy films
Films directed by Yoji Yamada
1980s Japanese-language films
Otoko wa Tsurai yo films
Japanese sequel films
Shochiku films
Films with screenplays by Yôji Yamada
1980s Japanese films